Gustavo Heide (born 28 February 2002) is a Brazilian tennis player.

Heide has a career high ATP singles ranking of 532 achieved on 22 November 2021. He also has a career high doubles ranking of 637 achieved on 22 November 2021.

Heide has won 1 ATP Challenger doubles title at the 2021 Aberto da República with Mateus Alves.

ATP Challenger and ITF Futures finals

Singles: 7 (5–2)

Doubles 8 (4–4)

References

External links
 
 

2002 births
Living people
Brazilian male tennis players
Sportspeople from São Paulo
21st-century Brazilian people